Kushkak (also Romanized as Kūshkak; also known as Kuckak) is a village in Kushkak Rural District of Qohestan District, Darmian County, South Khorasan province, Iran. At the 2006 National Census, its population was 867 in 251 households, when it was in Qohestan Rural District. The following census in 2011 counted 858 people in 256 households. The latest census in 2016 showed a population of 877 people in 277 households. After the census, the village became the capital of the newly formed Kushkak Rural District.

References 

Darmian County

Populated places in South Khorasan Province

Populated places in Darmian County